John Brathwaite (born 24 February 1872, date of death unknown) was a Barbadian cricketer. He played in three first-class matches for the Barbados cricket team in 1891/92.

See also
 List of Barbadian representative cricketers

References

External links
 

1872 births
Year of death missing
Barbadian cricketers
Barbados cricketers
People from Saint John, Barbados